Valentyna Goncharova (born 17 September 1990) is a Ukrainian sport shooter.

She participated at the 2018 ISSF World Shooting Championships, winning a medal.

References

External links

Living people
1990 births
Ukrainian female sport shooters
ISSF pistol shooters
21st-century Ukrainian women